The Baird ministry (2014–2015) or First Baird ministry was the 94th ministry of the Government of New South Wales, and was led by Mike Baird, the state's 44th Premier.

The Liberal–National coalition ministry was formed following the announcement by Barry O'Farrell on 16 April 2014 that he would resign as Premier. Baird was elected as leader of the Liberal Party on 17 April 2014 and was sworn in as Premier together with his ministry on 23 April 2014 at Government House by the Governor of New South Wales Marie Bashir.

The ministry covered the period from 17 April 2014 until 2 April 2015 when the Second Baird ministry was formed, following the re-election of the Coalition at the 2015 state election.

Composition of ministry
The first rearrangement occurred in May 2014 when Mike Gallacher resigned from the ministry after he was named at the Independent Commission Against Corruption for alleged involvement in a corrupt scheme to receive illegal political donations. The second rearrangement occurred in  October 2014 following the resignation of Andrew Stoner as Deputy Premier and Leader of the National Party citing family reasons. Troy Grant was elected unopposed to succeed him as leader of the Nationals.

 
Ministers are members of the Legislative Assembly unless otherwise noted.

See also

Members of the New South Wales Legislative Assembly, 2011–2015
Members of the New South Wales Legislative Council, 2011–2015

Notes

References

 

! colspan=3 style="border-top: 5px solid #cccccc" | New South Wales government ministries

New South Wales ministries
2014 establishments in Australia
2015 disestablishments in Australia